Calgary-Hays is a provincial electoral district mandated to return one member to the Legislative Assembly of Alberta, Canada using the first past the post method of voting.

The riding was formed in 2004, carved out of the Calgary-Shaw electoral district. The district is named after former Calgary mayor and Canadian Senator Harry Hays who represented the electoral district of Calgary South as a Member of Parliament.

In its present boundaries the electoral district covers the deep southeast corner of Calgary and includes the neighbourhoods of McKenzie Lake, McKenzie Towne, Quarry Park, Douglas Glen, and Douglasdale.

History
The electoral district was created in the 2003 boundary redistribution from Calgary-Shaw. The 2010 boundary redistribution split the riding in half to form most of Calgary-South East due to significant growth of new communities in the southeast quadrant of Calgary.

Boundary history

Electoral history

The electoral district was created in the boundary redistribution of 2004 out of Calgary-Shaw after that electoral district became one of the most populated electoral districts in Alberta.

The first election held in the district in 2004 saw Progressive Conservative candidate Arthur Johnston win the election with a landslide majority taking nearly 64% of the popular vote while the second place candidate trailed far behind with just 22%.

Johnston stood for re-election in the 2008 provincial election. He won a higher popular vote but his percentage of victory dropped as the Liberal and Wildrose Alliance candidates made gains. However Johnston held the district with almost 55% of the popular vote.

Johnston announced his retirement as incumbent after being defeated twice for the Progressive Conservative nomination in Calgary-Hays and in the new electoral district of Calgary-South East.

In 2012, PC Candidate Ric McIver defeated Wayne Anderson, contender for the Wild Rose Party, to become the second representative for the Hays district since its creation.

Legislature results

2004 general election

2008 general election

2012 general election

2015 general election

2019 general election

Senate nominee results

2004 Senate nominee election district results

Voters had the option of selecting 4 Candidates on the Ballot

2012 Senate nominee election district results

References

External links 
Electoral Divisions Act 2003
Riding Map for Calgary Hays
Calgary Hays Demographics
Website of the Legislative Assembly of Alberta

Alberta provincial electoral districts
Politics of Calgary